The 1971–72 season was the Trail Blazers second season in the National Basketball Association (NBA). Geoff Petrie missed 22 games due to injury. Petrie who averaged 24.8 points per game in his rookie season would drop nearly 6 points per game as the Blazers finished with an NBA worst record of 18–64. One of the highlights of the season was Sidney Wicks. He would win the Rookie of the Year with a team best 24.5 points per game.

Before the start of the season, Blazers guard Rick Adelman was named captain, making him the first in franchise history.

Portland head coach Rolland Todd was fired on February 2, 1972 and replaced by Stu Inman, the Blazers director of player personnel. Todd's dismissal came in the wake of a 129–117 loss to the Phoenix Suns the day before. Portland players were allegedly upset with team management for placing guard Willie McCarter on waivers. Sidney Wicks was accused by Todd and Inman of playing lackadaisical defense, allowing his opponent Paul Silas to take 30 shots against him. Charlie Yelverton sat on the bench during th U.S. national anthem and did not participate in pre-game warmups.

Roster

Regular season

Season Standings

Record vs. opponents

Game log

Awards and honors
 Sidney Wicks, NBA Rookie of the Year Award
 Sidney Wicks, NBA All-Rookie Team 1st Team

References

 Blazers on Database Basketball
 Blazers on Reference Basketball

Portland
Portland Trail Blazers seasons
Portland Trail Blazers 1971
Portland Trail Blazers 1971
Portland
Portland